Ahmed Mulay Ali Hamadi (born 1954) is the current Sahrawi ambassador to Mexico, with a base in Mexico City. He is a licenciate on International Relations by the UNAM, and a member of the "Mexican Academy of International Law". Apart from his diplomatic career, Mulay Ali is also a writer in Spanish language, with books published in Mexico.

Personal life
Mulay Ali was born in 1954 in Hagunia, a town near El Aaiun, the capital of the territory. In 1976, he was among the Polisario Front militants helping the Sahrawi civilians who were fleeing from the cities occupied by Morocco. In 1997, he was an observer of the identification process in El Aaiun for the planned self-determination referendum, and saw his mother and daughter for the first time since 1976.

Diplomatic postings
From 2001 to 2004, he was the POLISARIO Delegate in Madrid, Spain. In August 2004, he was designated as Sahrawi resident ambassador in the United Mexican States, replacing Bachari Saleh.

Books
In 2006 the editorial Sky published his novel "Viaje a la Sabiduría del Desierto" ("Journey to the Wisdom of the Desert"). In 2008, the short story "El Silencioso Debate de los Animales" ("The Animals Silent Debate") was published by Libros de Godot. In 2011, he self-published in Bubok the novel "Los Senderos de la Vida" ("The Paths of Life").

References

Polisario Front politicians
Sahrawi Sunni Muslims
Living people
1954 births
Ambassadors of the Sahrawi Arab Democratic Republic to Mexico
Sahrawi writers